The Genealogy and Heraldry Bill 2006 was a private member's bill introduced in Seanad Éireann by Brendan Ryan to reform the statutory basis for the office of  Chief Herald of Ireland.

History 
The bill was drafted  by Michael Merrigan, co-founder of the Genealogical Society of Ireland (GSI). The bill has its second reading in December 2006, but lapsed with the dissolution of the Dáil and Seanad for the 2007 election. The status of the herald's office had previously been the topic of an adjournment debate in 1995, and was amended by the National Cultural Institutions Act, 1997, legislation which the GSI regards as flawed.

References

External links
 

Proposed laws of Ireland
Irish genealogy
Heraldry and law